Ben Barron Ross (July 26, 1921 – December 30, 2016) was an American politician in the state of Georgia. A lawyer, he is an alumnus of Mercer University. He served in the Georgia House of Representatives from 1957 to 1962 and from 1965 to 1987.

References

1921 births
2016 deaths
Mercer University alumni
Democratic Party members of the Georgia House of Representatives